Austell is a city in Cobb and Douglas Counties in the U.S. state of Georgia. It is part of the Atlanta metropolitan area. As of the 2020 census, the city had a population of 7,713.

History
The area that is now Austell was frequented by game hunters and trappers on their way to the area's salt licks. These early visitors claimed the area's waters had medicinal properties. It soon became a destination for therapeutic healing, leading to the founding of a town known as Salt Springs. As immigration increased and demand for land near the spring grew, G. O. Mozely donated and subdivided  of his land, enhancing the loose settlement with a street plan. Later, the spring was renamed Lithia Springs due to the water containing lithium carbonate, and the neighboring city of Lithia Springs was founded in 1882. In 1888, the lithia spring water was bottled and sold under the commercial name Bowden Lithia Spring Water. The historic lithia spring water is still bottled and sold under the name brand Lithia Spring Water. The Georgia Pacific Railway chose the town of Austell to be a station depot, being the dividing point for the major Birmingham and Chattanooga railway lines.

Austell was incorporated in 1885. The town is named for General Alfred Austell (1814–1881), in recognition of his efforts to bring major railways to the South. General Austell also founded the Atlanta National Bank (later renamed First Atlanta), which eventually became part of Wachovia and later Wells Fargo through various mergers and acquisitions.  General Austell is buried in an elaborate Gothic Revival–style mausoleum at the highest point in Atlanta's Oakland Cemetery.

In 2009, Sweetwater Creek flooded, destroying many homes and businesses in the Austell area.

Geography
Austell is located along the southern border of Cobb County at  (33.815905, −84.636242). A small portion of the city extends south into Douglas County. It is bordered by Lithia Springs to the south and Mableton to the east. U.S. Route 78 passes through the city, leading east  to downtown Atlanta and west  to Douglasville.

Topography
Sweetwater Creek, a tributary of the Chattahoochee River, flows through the city, passing north, then east of the city center. The area is relatively flat, with few large hills.

Climate
According to the Köppen classification, Austell has a humid subtropical climate with hot, humid summers and mild, but occasionally cold winters by the standards of the southern United States. The city experiences four distinct seasons. In a normal summer it is not unusual for temperatures to exceed 90 °F (32 °C). Occasionally, high temperatures will struggle to reach , and nights can dip into the teens. Subzero temperatures are very uncommon and only occur once every decade or so.

Demographics

2020 census

As of the 2020 United States census, there were 7,713 people, 2,691 households, and 1,794 families residing in the city.

2000 census
As of the census of 2000, there were 5,359 people, 2,009 households, and 1,386 families residing in the city. The racial makeup of the city is:
 Black alone – 3,593 (54.6%)
 White alone – 1,932 (29.4%)
 Hispanic – 782 (11.9%)
 Two or more races – 134 (2.0%)
 Asian alone – 96 (1.5%)
 Other race alone – 22 (0.3%)
 American Indian alone – 13 (0.2%)
 Native Hawaiian and Other Pacific Islander alone – 9 (0.1%)

There were 2,009 households, out of which 35.0% had children under the age of 18 living with them, 44.3% were married couples living together, 18.5% had a female householder with no husband present, and 31.0% were non-families. Of all households, 24.5% were made up of individuals, and 6.0% had someone living alone who was 65 years of age or older.  The average household size was 2.66 and the average family size was 3.15.

In the city, the population was spread out, with 27.3% under the age of 18, 9.5% from 18 to 24, 37.0% from 25 to 44, 17.8% from 45 to 64, and 8.3% who were 65 years of age or older.  The median age was 32 years. For every 100 females, there were 97.8 males.  For every 100 females age 18 and over, there were 93.4 males.

The median income for a household in the city was $38,933, and the median income for a family was $39,635. Males had a median income of $31,750 versus $22,944 for females. The per capita income for the city was $15,924.  About 11.0% of families and 12.8% of the population were below the poverty line, including 13.0% of those under age 18 and 8.8% of those age 65 or over.

Economy
The economy of Austell in its early years was largely tied to the rail depot, transferring people and goods and allowing many residents to commute to nearby Atlanta in pursuit of higher paying, more abundant jobs. Passengers no longer move by rail to or from Austell, though. Other industry includes recycling paper and plastics with exports going as far as China.

Arts and culture

Annual events
The City of Austell holds an annual July 4 fireworks celebration.

Points of interest

The Collar Community Center located near downtown is used for civic organizations and local get-togethers. The South Cobb Recreation Center is a  facility that offers a gym, two multipurpose rooms, a caterer's kitchen, six offices, a conference room, three restrooms and a lobby. It has an occupational capacity of 939.

Sports
During summer, softball games are nearly a continual occurrence with city leagues having 30 games and 450 players. In addition to cheerleading, 32 teams of over 500 youths are sponsored by the Sweetwater Valley Youth Association. Five lighted fields accommodate baseball and softball aficionados. Collar Park and Washington Street Park both have tennis courts.

Parks and recreation
The Austell Parks and Recreation Department maintains five recreational facilities and seven parks Berry Park, a passive park, Collar Park and Legion Park which are both community parks, and Pine Street, Stephens, Washington Street and Berry Park which are neighborhood parks.

Government
The city of Austell has seven elected officials: Mayor, representatives of four wards and two representatives at-large.

Education
Public education in Cobb County is handled by the Cobb County School District. Public schools in the city limits include Austell Primary School, Austell Elementary School, Garrett Middle School, and South Cobb High School.

Private schools in the city include:

 Cumberland Christian Academy
 Good Shepherd Learning Center 
 Sunbrook Academy at Barnes Mill
 The Goddard School is located north of Austell

Media
The locally read newspapers include the South Cobb Patch, The Atlanta Journal-Constitution and the Fulton County Daily Report.

Transportation
It also sits on the divergence of two Norfolk Southern rail lines, one to Birmingham and the other to Chattanooga.

Explanatory notes

References

External links
 City of Austell official website

Cities in Cobb County, Georgia
Cities in Douglas County, Georgia
Cities in Georgia (U.S. state)
Cities in the Atlanta metropolitan area